Crescendo International College is a college in Desa Cemerlang, Mukim Tebrau, Johor Bahru, Johor.

History
The College began its operations in January 2001 in an office building in downtown Johor Bahru. In May 2013, the College moved to a new campus at Taman Desa Cemerlang, which accommodates up to 1,200 students and is equipped with facilities including a cafeteria, lecture halls, and dormitories.

Facilities

Main building
 Lecture Halls
 Science Labs
 Library 
 Study Area
 Air-conditioned Cafeteria
 Hostel

Sports Complex
 Swimming pool
 Multipurpose Hall
 Tennis Court
 Football Field
 Track and field
 Dance Studio

Academic programmes
Crescendo International College offers several programmes:-

Cambridge International A Level
Cambridge International A Level (Science)
Cambridge International A Level (Commerce)

Diploma Programmes
Diploma in Business
Diploma in Computer Science (Systems Development)
Diploma in Airline Services

University of London International Programmes (UOLIP)
BSc Accounting & Finance
BSc Business & Management
Bachelor of Laws (LLB)

Masters Programme
MSc in Professional Accountancy

Executive Training Programmes
ACCA
English

Transportation

Public Transport
Public transportation such as taxis and Grab are available.

Shuttle Service
A scheduled shuttle bus is provided for students and staff to travel to and from campus.

Events
Many events are conducted throughout the year for both students and staff to enjoy. These range from seasonal events to academic summits which serves as a purpose to educate and entertain. Some of these events include:
Open day 
Wikipedia meetups 
Christmas talent show

See also
 Lists of schools in Malaysia

References

External links

 

2001 establishments in Malaysia
Buildings and structures in Johor Bahru
Private universities and colleges in Malaysia
Universities and colleges in Johor
Educational institutions established in 2001